Thomas A. Delaney (April 23, 1886 – May 17, 1969) was an American lawyer and politician.

Born in Oconto, Wisconsin, Delaney went to the East Side High School in Green Bay, Wisconsin. Delaney received his law degree from Marquette University Law School and practiced law in Green Bay, Wisconsin. Delaney served as police justice for the city of Green Bay and was involved with the Democratic Party. In 1919, Delaney served in the Wisconsin State Assembly. He died in Milwaukee, Wisconsin.

Notes

1886 births
1968 deaths
Politicians from Green Bay, Wisconsin
People from Oconto, Wisconsin
Marquette University Law School alumni
Wisconsin lawyers
Wisconsin state court judges
20th-century American judges
20th-century American politicians
20th-century American lawyers
Democratic Party members of the Wisconsin State Assembly